All Saints Church is in Station Road, Hesketh Bank, Lancashire, England.  It is an active Anglican parish church in the deanery of Leyland, the archdeaconry of Blackburn, and the diocese of Blackburn.

History
The church was designed by the Lancaster architect Henry Paley of Austin and Paley, and built between 1925 and 1926.  Plans had been made in 1923 for a church with a spire, which would have cost about £6,500, but these were scaled back, and the planned spire was replaced by a tower with a saddleback roof.  The new church replaced a smaller church built in 1765, and the site was given by Major T. Fermor-Hesketh.  The tower was completed by the same architect in 1935 at a cost of £721.

Architecture
The authors of the Buildings of England series state that this a small church, but that its broad west tower is "impressive".  The tower is supported by stepped angle buttresses, and it has a pyramidal roof recessed on two sides.  The windows contain tracery based on the Decorated and Perpendicular styles.

See also

List of ecclesiastical works by Austin and Paley (1916–44)
Becconsall Old Church

References
Citations

Sources

External links
All Saints, Hesketh-with-Becconsall – church website

Church of England church buildings in Lancashire
Churches in the Borough of West Lancashire
Diocese of Blackburn
Churches completed in 1936
20th-century Church of England church buildings
Austin and Paley buildings
Gothic Revival architecture in Lancashire
Gothic Revival church buildings in England